Pekon Gayam is a small Indonesian village in the South Lampung province and in the sub-district of Penengahan. It is in the southernmost part of Sumatra.

Since most of its inhabitants are farmers, the main productions of the village are coffee, rice, pepper, fruits (banana, coconut, and durian), and other produce. The village is populated by mostly Lampungese with small numbers of Javanese, or Sundanese, and is Islamite.

Populated places in Lampung
Lampung